The Liberty Bell is an iconic symbol of American independence, located in Philadelphia, Pennsylvania.

Liberty Bell may also refer to:

Liberty Bell replicas
Liberty Bell (Oregon State Capitol), Salem Oregon
Liberty Bell (Portland, Oregon)
Liberty Bell Museum, Allentown, Pennsylvania
Justice Bell (Valley Forge), a replica in Pennsylvania representing women's suffrage
Freedom Bell, Berlin, Germany
Freedom Bell, American Legion, Washington, D.C.
State Museum of Pennsylvania, Harrisburg, Pennsylvania

Music
"The Liberty Bell" (march), an 1893 composition by John Philip Sousa
"Liberty Bell (It's Time to Ring Again)", a 1917 song composed by Joe Goodwin and Halsey K. Mohr
The Liberty Bell (band), an American 1960s garage rock band
Liberty Bell (album) or Fatty Gets a Stylist, an album by Fatty Gets a Stylist, 2011
"Liberty Bell", a song by The Gathering from How to Measure a Planet?, 1998

Other uses
The Liberty Bell (annual), an abolitionist publication from the 1800s
Liberty Bell (game), a 19th-century slot machine
Liberty Bell 7, one of the spacecraft of the Mercury spaceflight program
Liberty Bell Mountain, a mountain in Washington, U.S.
Liberty Bell Park Racetrack, a defunct horse racing track in Philadelphia that operated 1963–1986
Liberty Bell Ruby, largest mined ruby in the world, found in east Africa in the 1950s
"Liberty Bell of the West", a bell in Kaskaskia, Illinois, U.S.

See also
Liberty Belle (disambiguation)